No. 11 Productions is a non-profit 501(c)3 theatre company based in New York City. The company's productions have been reviewed by The Washington Post, NYTheatre.com, The Happiest Medium, Broadwayworld.com, and DCTheatreScene.com. No.11 Productions has produced works at the New York International Fringe Festival, FRIGID New York, Kentucky Repertory Theatre, Fringe Wilmington, The Bushwick Starr, @Seaport, Capital Fringe Festival, 14th Street Theatre, Van Cortlandt Park, and SaratogaArtsFest.

History 
No.11 Productions was founded in 2008 by Skidmore College alumni Julie Congress, Mitchell Conway, Erin Daley, Ryan Emmons and Jen Neads.  The company has produced eleven full-length productions, ten staged readings, a music video and a fundraiser.

Full Production Timeline

2012 
 Quest for the West: Adventures on the Oregon Trail!
 MythUnderstood
 Coosje

2011 
 A Christmas Carol
 11-11-11 Cabaret Gala
 MythUnderstood
 Quest for the West: Adventures on the Oregon Trail!
 Lysistrata
 Places

2010 
 Cat People
 Lysistrata
 Assemblywomen
 Cogito
 Medea

2009 
 Lysistrata
 Claire and the Ornithological Shadow
 The Elephant Man - The Musical
 Seaport the Arts Fundraiser
 MythUnderstood
 Jet of Blood
 11 Celebrates 10 Reading Series

2008 
 Claire and the Ornithological Shadow
 We Three
 Lysistrata

External links

References 

Theatre companies in New York City